KwaDukuza Local Municipality is one of four municipalities under iLembe District Municipality, KwaZulu-Natal, South Africa.

Main places
The 2001 census divided the municipality into the following main places:

Politics 

The municipal council consists of fifty-nine members elected by mixed-member proportional representation. Thirty councillors are elected by first-past-the-post voting in thirty wards, while the remaining twenty-nine are chosen from party lists so that the total number of party representatives is proportional to the number of votes received. In the election of 1 November 2021 the African National Congress (ANC) lost its majority, obtaining a plurality of twenty-nine seats on the council.

The following table shows the results of the 2021 election.

See also
 List of South African municipalities

References

External links
 Official website

Local municipalities of the iLembe District Municipality
KwaDukuza Local Municipality